The 1982 LPGA Tour was the 33rd season since the LPGA Tour officially began in 1950. The season ran from January 28 to November 7. The season consisted of 35 official money events. JoAnne Carner and Beth Daniel won the most tournaments, five each. Carner led the money list with earnings of $310,400.

There were three first-time winners in 1982: Janet Alex, Cathy Morse, and Ayako Okamoto. Sandra Haynie won the last of her 42 LPGA events in 1982.

The tournament results and award winners are listed below.

Tournament results
The following table shows all the official money events for the 1982 season. "Date" is the ending date of the tournament. The numbers in parentheses after the winners' names are the number of wins they had on the tour up to and including that event. Majors are shown in bold.

Awards

References

External links
LPGA Tour official site
1982 season coverage at golfobserver.com

LPGA Tour seasons
LPGA Tour